Mimi Abramovitz is an American author, educator and activist. Abramovitz's work focuses on civil and welfare rights of those living in the United States, especially women.

Education

Abramovitz completed her undergraduate work at the University of Michigan, where she earned a B.A. in Sociology in 1963. She went on to obtain her master's degree in social work in 1967 and her Ph.D in social work from Columbia University in 1981.

Career

Abramovitz moved to New Haven, Connecticut, where she became active in an existing organization and went on co-found other organizations. She became active in  the American Independent Movement,  an organization who summarizes their goal, "The American Independent Movement (AIM) has been working since 1966 to get people together against the rich, powerful few who run New Haven and the whole country". She'd also go on, while in New Haven, to co-found with other women, New Haven Women's Liberation, an organization that allowed her to focus on welfare rights, organize anti-war rallies in Washington, D.C., and the unionization of Yale University clerical workers. Abramovitz would begin to teach social welfare policy at the Hunter College.

Abramovitz, along with Jan Poppendeick and Melinda Lackey created a course at Hunter College called the Community Leadership course, which consists of both education about the history of activism and training in relevant skills. Then students use these skills in the community, aided by a student organization, the Welfare Rights Initiative(WRI), which was also co-founded by an Abramovitz, Poppendeick, and Lackey. The WRI describes itself as a  "grassroots student activist and community leadership training organization" whose mission is to train and support "students who have firsthand experience of poverty to effectively promote access to education for all".

Abramovitz serves as the Bertha Capen Reynolds Professor of Social Policy  and as the department chair Social Welfare Policy at Hunter College School of Social Work

Awards and honors

  Outstanding Book award (1977) by the Gustavus Myers Center For the Study of Human Rights, for her book Under Attack, Fighting Back: Women and Welfare in the United States.
 Feminist Scholarship Award (2004) by the Council on Social Work Education (CSWE).
 Distinguished Recent Contributions in Social Work Education Award (2004) awarded by the Council on Social Work Education (CSWE)
 Inducted as a fellow of the American Academy of Social Work and Social Welfare (2015)

Bibliography

Books

Chapters in books

Journal articles

References

External links

An oral history interview with Abramovitz from Columbia University.
 Welfare Rights Initiative

1941 births
21st-century scholars
21st-century American women writers
American feminist writers
American social workers
Columbia University School of Social Work alumni
Hunter College faculty
CUNY School of Labor and Urban Studies faculty
Living people
University of Michigan College of Literature, Science, and the Arts alumni
American women non-fiction writers
21st-century American non-fiction writers